Stupnica may refer to:
 Stupnica (Leskovac), a village in Jablanica District, Serbia
 Stupnica (Loznica), a village in Mačva District, Serbia
 Stupnica (river), in Poland